Anelassorhynchus is a genus of spoonworms in the subclass Echiura.

Species
The World Register of Marine Species includes these species in this genus:-

Anelassorhynchus adelaidensis Edmonds, 1960
Anelassorhynchus branchiorhynchus (Annandale & Kemp, 1915)
Anelassorhynchus chaetiferus DattaGupta, Menon & Johnson, 1963
Anelassorhynchus dendrorhynchus (Annandale & Kemp, 1915)
Anelassorhynchus fisheri DattaGupta, 1974
Anelassorhynchus inansensis (Ikeda, 1904)
Anelassorhynchus indivisus (Sluiter, 1900)
Anelassorhynchus loborhynchus DattaGupta & Menon, 1966
Anelassorhynchus microrhynchus (Prashad, 1919)
Anelassorhynchus moebii (Greeff, 1879)
Anelassorhynchus mucosus (Ikeda, 1904)
Anelassorhynchus panamensis Biseswar & Glynn, 2016
Anelassorhynchus porcellus Fisher, 1948
Anelassorhynchus sabinus (Lanchester, 1905)
Anelassorhynchus semoni (Fischer, 1896)
Anelassorhynchus vegrandis (Lampert, 1883)

References

Echiurans